Itala may refer to the following:

Itala lingvo, the Italian language
Itala, an Italian car manufacturer
Itala, Sicily, a municipality in Sicily
Itala Game Reserve, in KwaZulu-Natal, South Africa
Ville Itälä, a Finnish politician
 a term for the Vetus Latina or "Old Latin" translation of the Bible
Itala, a city in "Somalia italiana', now called Adale.

See also
 Jaakko Itälä (1933–2017), Finnish politician
Italia (disambiguation)